Jasper Jack Kraynick (September 2, 1914 –  October 31, 1943) was an American football back who played for the North Carolina Tar Heels. He later was selected in the 1939 NFL Draft, but did not play professionally.

Early life and education 
Kraynick was born on September 2, 1914, in Trenton, New Jersey. He attended Trenton Central High School and Staunton Military Academy in Virginia, graduating in 1935. Afterwards he joined the University of North Carolina, and spent his first year on the freshman football team. He was on their varsity roster in 1936, but did not appear in any games.

Professional career 
He earned his first varsity playing time in 1937, earning a letter and playing fullback. Following his senior season of 1938, Kraynick was selected in the 12th round (104th overall) of the 1939 NFL Draft by the Philadelphia Eagles, but opted not to play professionally. Instead, he taught at Belmont High School and served as athletics director. He resigned in 1941 to join the United States Army Air Forces in World War II.

Military career 
He entered on February 15, 1941, and was commissioned a second lieutenant upon graduation from flying school at Maxwell Field. He was promoted to the rank of first lieutenant on February 1, 1942, and was given the Air Medal and an oak leaf cluster in September 1943. He went missing on October 30, 1943, after his plane flying over the Caribbean Sea did not return. He was not found and presumed to have died.

See also
List of people who disappeared mysteriously at sea

References

1914 births
1940s missing person cases
1943 deaths
Missing in action of World War II
North Carolina Tar Heels football players
People lost at sea
Players of American football from Trenton, New Jersey
Recipients of the Air Medal
Trenton Central High School alumni
United States Army Air Forces personnel killed in World War II
United States Army Air Forces pilots of World War II